BTR-90 (GAZ-5923) is an 8×8 wheeled armored personnel carrier developed in Russia, designed in 1993 and first shown publicly in 1994. It is a larger version of the BTR-80 vehicle, fitted with a BMP-2 turret. Armour protection is improved compared with the BTR-80, giving protection from 14.5 mm projectiles over the frontal arc.

It is armed with a 2A42 30 mm auto cannon, a coaxial 7.62 mm PKT machine gun, an AT-5 Spandrel ATGM, as well as an AGS-17D 30 mm automatic grenade launcher. Limited numbers have been produced and are in service with Russian Internal Troops.

In October 2011, the Ministry of Defence refused to buy the BTR-90 and did not include them in the list of the state program of armament until 2020, and waived exports for the BTR-90.

Subsequently, the Russian army chose to assemble a large number of BTR-82A. The combat effectiveness has already increased significantly, and it is derived from the BTR-80. The development cost for BTR-82A is omitted and the production cost is cheaper, making the less advanced BTR-90 even less likely to change its fate. The 2015 Moscow Victory Parade exposed the next-generation VPK-7829 Bumerang wheeled armored vehicle, and officially announced that the BTR-90 program could no longer be resurrected.

Development
The development of the BTR-90 was carried out at the Arzamas Machine Building Plant (AMZ), a subsidiary of the Military Industrial Company. Development commenced in the early 1990s, with the first prototype completed and displayed to the public in 1994. The vehicle was intended to be used by mechanized units of the Russian army, as well as marine units of the Russian Navy, as a vehicle for providing fire support, transportation of personnel, surveillance, reconnaissance, and patrolling tasks. A wide range of vehicles suiting various requirements can be developed on the basis of the BTR-90 chassis.

The vehicle is designed to be highly mobile and maneuverable in all terrain, while providing a high level of protection for its crew and passengers. The BTR-90 is fitted with a gun turret identical to the one used on the BMP-2.

Description
The BTR-90 has a pointed nose, somewhat similar to that of the LAV-25. The hull is made of welded steel armour plate, and is slightly larger and higher than the BTR-80, from which it is developed.

A turbo charged, liquid cooled, multi-fuel diesel engine is used, which can develop 510 bhp. The vehicle has eight-wheel drive and has an automatic reversible hydro mechanical transmission, which is capable of providing different speeds to each side of the vehicle. It has duplicated electrical and compressed air engine start systems. The wheels are utilized with independent torsion-bar suspension and the traverse arms have high capacity telescopic hydraulic shock absorbers.

Communication equipment installed in the BTR-90 include an R-163-50U radio set for external communications, an R-163UP receiver, and an R-174 intercom device for communication between the crew members.

Layout
The commander and gunner are accommodated in a fighting compartment in the turret. This compartment houses a BPK-3-42 gunner's day/night sight and a 1P-13 commander's optical sight. Optionally, a BPK-M thermal imaging sight  can be fitted in this compartment as the gunner's sight.

The driver is located somewhat to the middle of the hull, just in front of the turret. The troop compartment is located behind the driver's position and the turret. The engine compartment is at the rear of the hull.

Hatches are provided on the top of the turret and hull, and side doors are available on the middle of the vehicle. These are designed to allow quick dismounting and boarding of troops even while the vehicle is on the move.

The eight wheels are located as two sets, with two pairs at the front of the hull and two pairs at the rear. Split side doors are located between these two sets of wheels. The two forward pairs of wheels are utilized with power steering.

Capabilities and features
The BTR-90 is capable of achieving a maximum speed of 100 km/h, and has cross-country driving ability comparable to that of tracked vehicles, with an average speed of 50 km/h.

The vehicle is fully amphibious and can negotiate water obstacles without any preparation. Two water jet propellers power the vehicle in water. In water it can achieve a maximum speed of 9 km/h. It can enter and be deployed from amphibious assault ships from the water. The BTR-90 can be deployed by truck, rail and by water and air transportation means.

Its hydro mechanical transmission helps to increase its maneuverability by providing different speeds to each side of the vehicle. This allows the BTR-90 to have a low turning radius of 6 m. When turning with only the front four wheels, it has a turning radius of 14 m. It can cross up to 2.1 m wide trenches and can negotiate 60% gradients, 30% side slopes and 0.8 m vertical steps.

The vehicle has an inner capacity of 12 cubic meters, and can carry a load of 7,000 kg. An air conditioning system can be added optionally. The commander has the ability to carry out all-round surveillance and can take full control of the weapons from the gunner. An onboard information control system (OICS) enables automatic control over the transmission, engine and other important parts of the BTR-90, and it is the first armoured personnel carrier to have such a system. A centralized tire pressure control system is available, and allows the vehicle to move even if four of its wheels are destroyed.

Armour and protection
The armour of the BTR-90 comprises welded steel armour plates. The armour can withstand hits from 14.5 mm rounds over the frontal arc. The side armour can provide protection against large caliber machine gun fire and shrapnel.

Additional armoured plates can be installed on the vehicle to increase protection. Active protection methods can be used, such as explosive reactive armour. These can be added over the existing armour of the vehicle. To increase protection, periscopes are installed instead of windscreens and vision blocks.

Collective NBC (Nuclear, Biological and Chemical) protection is available which can protect the occupants from shock waves and penetrating radiation from nuclear attacks, radioactive dust, and bacteriological and chemical weapons.

Its combat tires are capable of enduring anti-personnel mine explosions and small arms fire. If the vehicle is damaged while afloat, a drainage system is capable of removing incoming water. The BTR-90 features an automatic fire fighting system, and a system for the remote laying of smoke screens. The smoke discharge system includes six smoke grenade launchers, three on each side of the vehicle.

Armament
The main gun of the BTR-90 is a 30 mm Shipunov 2A42 auto cannon. The vehicle carries an ammunition load of 500 rounds for this weapon.

A 7.62 mm PKT coaxial machine gun with 2,000 rounds and a 30 mm AGS-17 automatic grenade launcher are the secondary armaments of the BTR-90.

A guided missile system is available for engaging armoured targets. This consists of four 9M113 Konkurs missiles mounted on the turret. The launching unit is detachable, and can be used to launch missiles from the ground.

All the weapons are mounted on the turret and are assisted by a fire control system. The fire control system allows the weapons to be used while the vehicle is moving, and in all weather conditions. The turret can be traversed 360 degrees with an elevation range of −5 to +75 degrees. The vehicle's weaponry allows it to engage targets at ranges up to 4 km. Helicopters and fortifications can be engaged at ranges up to 2.5 km.

In addition to the vehicle's weapons, its occupants have the ability to fire their weapons through available firing ports and hatches, increasing its firepower.

Variants
A prototype designated BTR-90M was built with a larger turret derived from the BMP-3, mounting a coaxial low-velocity 2A70 100mm rifled gun/missile launcher system (which can fire conventional shells or laser beam-riding 9M117 anti-tank missiles (ATGM), such as AT-10 Stabber), a 30mm Shipunov 2A72 cannon, and a 7.62mm PKT machine gun. The BTR-90M was first displayed publicly in 2001, and is not currently in service.

Another variant of the BTR-90 was produced with the low pressure 120 mm 2S9 Nona weapon, as with the BTR-80 Nona-SVK.

Gallery

See also

Comparable vehicles

 Stryker
 LAV III/LAV AFV/LAV-25/ASLAV
 Amphibious Combat Vehicle
 ZBL-08
 K808 Armored Personnel Carrier
 Tusan AFV
 Boxer
 Freccia IFV
 CM-32
 VPK-7829 Bumerang
 Type 96 Armored Personnel Carrier
 Type 16 maneuver combat vehicle
 Patria AMV
 BTR-4
 Saur 2
 VBCI
 KTO Rosomak
 FNSS Pars
 MOWAG Piranha
 Otokar Arma

References

External links

  manufacturer site
 BTR-90 Description and pictures to Army Recognition site
 FAS page

Armoured personnel carriers of Russia
GAZ Group military vehicles
Amphibious armoured personnel carriers
Armoured personnel carriers of the post–Cold War period
Wheeled amphibious armoured fighting vehicles
Eight-wheeled vehicles
Military vehicles introduced in the 2000s